Jenny Wolf (born 31 January 1979) is a former German speed skater. On 10 March 2007 at the ISU World Single Distances Speed Skating Championships in Salt Lake City, Utah, she broke the world record for the women's 500 m in her second race. She finished sixth on the 500 m at the 2006 Winter Olympics of Turin, and tenth on the same distance in 2002.

Wolf won the Speed Skating World Cup in the 2005–06 season on the 500 m. Her favorite distance is the 100 m, but this is not an Olympic event.

Wolf won the silver medal at the 500 m at the 2010 Winter Olympics in Vancouver, five hundredths of a second after South Korean Lee Sang-hwa over two races. Wolf was the world record holder in the event at the time.

On 13 November 2010, Wolf won her 40th 500 m World Cup race, thereby breaking Bonnie Blair's record, who won 39 World Cup races on that distance.

References

External links 
 
 
 
 
 
 Photos of Jenny Wolf
 

1979 births
German female speed skaters
Speed skaters at the 2002 Winter Olympics
Speed skaters at the 2006 Winter Olympics
Speed skaters at the 2010 Winter Olympics
Speed skaters at the 2014 Winter Olympics
Olympic speed skaters of Germany
Medalists at the 2010 Winter Olympics
Olympic medalists in speed skating
Olympic silver medalists for Germany
Speed skaters from Berlin
Living people
World Single Distances Speed Skating Championships medalists
World Sprint Speed Skating Championships medalists
Recipients of the Order of Merit of Berlin